Certificate of Maturity is a 1954 Soviet drama film directed by Tatyana Lukashevich.

Plot 
Gifted, but spoiled by the adoration of teachers and classmates, the young hero of the picture provoked a conflict in school. But friends on time pointed out the guy to the incorrectness of his behavior, and the general pet was punished by the force of collective indignation.

Cast
 Vasily Lanovoy as Valentin Listovsky
 Vadim Grachyov as Zhenya Kuznetsov  
 Galina Lyapina as Vika  
 Tamara Kirsanova as Klava  
 Aleksandr Susnin as Vanya Andreyev  
 Vladimir Andreyev as Yurka
 Yuri Krotenko as Kostya  
 Viktor Geraskin as Gera Grazhdankin  
 Georgi Chernovolenko as Boris Grotokhov
 Tatyana Lennikova as Antonina Yakovleva  
 Leonid Gallis as head teacher
 Vladimir Yemelyanov as  Valentin's  father 
 Lyudmila Skopina as Kuznetsova  
 Vladimir Kenigson as Pyotr Strakhov  
 Vladimir Dorofeyev as Uncle Vanya  
 Tatyana Pelttser as janitor
 Lev Borisov as Korobov  
 Roza Makagonova as Cinderella
 Vladimir Zemlyanikin as Dobchinsky

References

External links 
 

1954 films
Soviet drama films
1954 drama films
Films set in schools
Mosfilm films
Films based on Russian novels
1950s Russian-language films